Saint John the Evangelist is the Church of England parish church of Penge, Kent (now the London Borough of Bromley), in the Diocese of Rochester, Greater London. It is located on Penge High Street, and was erected 1847 to designs of architects Edwin Nash & J. N. Round. Later in 1861, Nash alone added the gabled aisles, and in 1866 the transepts. The Pevsner Buildings of England series guides describe it as "Rock-faced ragstone. West tower and stone broach spire. Geometrical tracery, treated in Nash's quirky way. The best thing inside is the open timber roofs, those in the transepts especially evocative, eight beams from all four directions meeting in mid air.  It has been Grade II listed since 1990.

The church is prevented from dominating the skyline of Penge by the distant tower farther south on Beckhenham Road of the Fortress Romanesque-looking Congregational church, built 1912 to designs by P. Morley Horder with passage aisles and clerestory, and shafts on large, excellently carved corbels. The early funding of the church came from John Dudin Brown who was a Thames wharfinger.

References

Penge
Churches completed in 1866
19th-century Church of England church buildings
Diocese of Rochester
1866 establishments in England
Grade II listed buildings in the London Borough of Bromley
Grade II listed churches in London